Wäinö Korhonen (21 December 1926 – 13 December 2018) was a Finnish modern pentathlete and épée fencer who competed at the 1956 Summer Olympics. He won two bronze medals in the individual and team modern pentathlon events. Korhonen won three team medals at the world championships of 1957–1959; his best individual result was fourth place in 1957. Domestically he won the Finnish title in 1954 and 1955, placing second in 1957 and 1962, and third in 1951, 1959, 1961, 1964 and 1967. Korhonen was also a Finnish champion in fencing, swimming and water polo. He was selected as the best Finnish modern pentathlete of the year in 1954, 1957 and 1962. In 2008, he was awarded the Pro Sports Award by the Ministry of Education of Finland.

References

External links
 

1926 births
2018 deaths
Finnish male épée fencers
Finnish male modern pentathletes
Olympic fencers of Finland
Olympic modern pentathletes of Finland
Fencers at the 1956 Summer Olympics
Modern pentathletes at the 1956 Summer Olympics
Olympic bronze medalists for Finland
Olympic medalists in modern pentathlon
Finnish male water polo players
World Modern Pentathlon Championships medalists
Medalists at the 1956 Summer Olympics